Ottavio Barsanti (c.1826–23 May 1884) was an Italian Franciscan priest, writer, and missionary in New Zealand. He was born in Pietrasanta, Italy c.1826.

References

1826 births
1884 deaths
Italian Franciscans
New Zealand writers
Franciscan missionaries
People of Tuscan descent
Italian emigrants to New Zealand
Italian Roman Catholic missionaries
Roman Catholic missionaries in New Zealand